Gala de gaffes à gogo, written and drawn by Franquin and Jidéhem, is an album of the original Gaston Lagaffe series, numbered R1. It is made up of 59 pages and was published by Dupuis. It consists of a series of one-strip gags.

Story
Monsieur De Mesmeaker appear for the first time and try to sign contracts, in vain. The  Gaston-Latex also appear, causing running gags. Finally, Prunelle and Lebrac appear at the end of the album, but they do not play an important role as yet, and most strips feature only Fantasio and Gaston.

Inventions
electric hammer: it must be fixed to the wall
rubber chair: chair that collapse when someone sits on it
Gaston Latex: rubber replica of Gaston
Mastigaston: saves someone from chewing before swallowing foods

Background
This album was first published in the Italian format. As these albums were sold out, Dupuis decided to reprint it at the common Franco-Belgian album format. This album is made up of the original albums numbered 2 and 3. It was numbered R1 to distinguish it from the album #1, "R" being a French abbreviation for "réédition" (re-publication).

References

 Gaston Lagaffe classic series on the official website
 Publication in Spirou  on bdoubliées.com.

External links
Official website 

1970 graphic novels
Comics by André Franquin